Theodore D. Mann (1922-1994)  was a Massachusetts politician who was the longest-serving mayor of Newton, Massachusetts. He was also the city's first Jewish mayor.

Before being elected Mayor, Mann served four terms as a member of the Newton Board of Aldermen (from 1958–1965), was on the Massachusetts Attorney General's Consumer Advisory Council, and was a member of the Massachusetts House of Representatives from 1965–1972.

During his tenure as Mayor, there were a number of city improvements. While Mann was a Republican, he was able to build coalitions across party lines. The new main Newton Free Library was built and dedicated to him shortly after he died. The recycling program was expanded. Mann was a 'hands on' mayor, and never failed to show up at any Newton event until he was on his deathbed at Newton-Wellesley Hospital.

He was part of the mission to Poland for the purpose of meeting with mayors in Warsaw and Krakow to work with newly elected officials on how to govern in an atmosphere still clouded due to 30 years of Communist rule.

He was the son of Hyman "Honey" Mann and Lillian Epstein Mann. Hyman Mann was a state representative in the 1930s. Mann, affectionately known as "Teddy," had two siblings: Thelma Mann Barkin (1926–1995) and Robert Ralph Mann (1924–). He was married to the former Florence Ober and together they had five children, Leslie, Richard, Eric, Debbie and, Stacie. As of 2011, each of Mann's five children had two children, one of whom has had two children as well, making Teddy a grandfather of 10 and great-grandfather of 2.

References

Massachusetts city council members
Mayors of Newton, Massachusetts
1922 births
1994 deaths
Boston College alumni
Boston University alumni
Businesspeople from Massachusetts
Jewish American people in Massachusetts politics
Jewish mayors of places in the United States
Republican Party members of the Massachusetts House of Representatives
20th-century American politicians
20th-century American businesspeople
20th-century American Jews